Ernest Roeber (September 1861 – April 30, 1944) was a German-American professional wrestler who held the European Greco-Roman Heavyweight Championship from 1894 to 1900 and from 1900 to 1901. Roeber also held the American Greco-Roman Heavyweight Championship and the German World Heavyweight Championship.

Championships and accomplishments
 Greco-Roman wrestling
 European Greco-Roman Heavyweight Championship (2 times)
 American Greco-Roman Heavyweight Championship (2 times)
 Professional wrestling
 German World Heavyweight Championship (1 time)

References

Sources
Sprechman, Jordan and Bill Shannon. This Day in New York Sports. Champaigne, Illinois: Sports Publishing LLC, 1998.

External links

1861 births
1944 deaths
Sportspeople from Hanover
American male professional wrestlers
German male professional wrestlers
Sportspeople from New York City
American people of German descent
19th-century professional wrestlers
20th-century professional wrestlers